Jones P. Madeira is a journalist from Trinidad and Tobago. He was editor-in-chief of the Trinidad and Tobago Guardian, from which position he was dismissed after prime minister Basdeo Panday accused him of bias in coverage of the November 1995 general election.

References

Living people
1944 births
Trinidad and Tobago broadcasters
People from Arima
Male journalists